Shurijeh may refer to:
 Shurijeh, Fars
 Shurijeh, West Azerbaijan
 Shuricheh (disambiguation)